Carperidine is an opioid analgesic drug related to meperidine. It has analgesic and antitussive effects with similar potency to codeine, though several related compounds are significantly more potent.

See also 
 Etoxeridine
 Furethidine
 Piminodine

References 

Amides
Esters
Piperidines
Ethyl esters